The 1996 New York Yankees season was the 94th season for the New York Yankees of Major League Baseball. The 1996 New York Yankees were managed by Joe Torre, and played at Yankee Stadium in the Bronx.

The team finished first in the American League Eastern Division with a record of 92–70, 4 games ahead of the Baltimore Orioles and won their first division title since 1981 (the 1994 team had the best record in the American League, but the strike took it away). The team defeated the Texas Rangers in the American League Division Series, three games to one.  The Yankees went on to defeat the Orioles in the American League Championship Series four games to one.

In the 1996 World Series the Yankees beat the defending National League and World Series champion Atlanta Braves four games to two, winning four consecutive games to overcome a two-games-to-none deficit. All told, the Yankees finished the post-season with an 8-0 road win–loss record, while going just 3-4 at home.

The Yankees earned their 23rd World Series title and their first since 1978. It was the last season for Hall of Fame TV announcer Phil Rizzuto, who left the team's broadcast crew that year.

Offseason
 December 4, 1995: Jalal Leach was drafted by the Montreal Expos from the New York Yankees in the 1995 minor league draft.
 December 7, 1995: Russ Davis and Sterling Hitchcock were traded by the Yankees to the Seattle Mariners for Tino Martinez, Jeff Nelson and Jim Mecir.
 December 11, 1995: Mariano Duncan was signed as a free agent by the Yankees.
 December 21, 1995: David Cone was signed as a free agent by the Yankees.
 December 28, 1995: The Yankees traded a player to be named later to the Chicago White Sox for Tim Raines. The Yankees completed the deal by sending Blaise Kozeniewski to the White Sox on February 6, 1996.
 February 20, 1996: Dwight Gooden was signed as a free agent by the Yankees.
 February 24, 1996: Tim McIntosh was signed as a free agent by the Yankees.
 March 31, 1996: Rafael Quirico was released by the Yankees.

Regular season

Notable transactions
 June 4, 1996: 1996 Major League Baseball draft
Nick Johnson was drafted by the Yankees in the 3rd round. Player signed June 14, 1996.
Scott Seabol was drafted by the Yankees in the 88th round. Player signed June 25, 1996.
 June 12, 1996: Rich Monteleone was traded by the Yankees to the California Angels for Mike Aldrete.
 June 12, 1996: Wally Whitehurst was selected off waivers by the Yankees from the Montreal Expos.
 July 4, 1996: Darryl Strawberry was purchased by the Yankees from the St. Paul Saints.
 July 31, 1996: Rubén Sierra and Matt Drews (minors) were traded by the Yankees to the Detroit Tigers for Cecil Fielder.
 July 31, 1996: Dave Weathers was traded by the Florida Marlins to the New York Yankees for Mark Hutton.
 August 22, 1996: Luis Sojo was selected off waivers by the Yankees from the Seattle Mariners.
 August 23, 1996: Bob Wickman and Gerald Williams were traded by the Yankees to the Milwaukee Brewers for Pat Listach, Graeme Lloyd and a player to be named later. The Brewers completed the trade by sending Ricky Bones to the Yankees on August 29.
 August 30, 1996: The Yankees traded a player to be named later to the Pittsburgh Pirates for Charlie Hayes. The Yankees completed the deal by sending Chris Corn to the Pirates on August 31.
 September 6, 1996: Robert Eenhoorn was selected off waivers from the Yankees by the California Angels.
 September 12, 1996: Wally Whitehurst was released by the Yankees.

Season standings

Record vs. opponents

Game log

|- bgcolor="ccffcc"
| 1 || April 2 || @ Indians || 7–1 || Cone (1–0) || Martinez || — || 42,289 || 1–0
|- bgcolor="ccffcc"
| 2 || April 3 || @ Indians || 5–1 || Pettitte (1–0) || McDowell || Nelson (1) || 41,843 || 2–0
|- bgcolor="ffbbbb"
| 3 || April 6 || @ Rangers || 2–4 || Witt || Key (0–1) || Henneman || 35,510 || 2–1
|- bgcolor="ffbbbb"
| 4 || April 7 || @ Rangers || 2–7 || Hill || Gooden (0–1) || — || — || 2–2
|- bgcolor="ffbbbb"
| 5 || April 7 || @ Rangers || 1–4 || Pavlik || Howe (0–1) || Vosberg || 36,248 || 2–3
|- bgcolor="ccffcc"
| 6 || April 9 || Royals || 7–3 || Pettitte (2–0) || Haney || — || 56,329 || 3–3
|- bgcolor="ccffcc"
| 7 || April 11 || Royals || 5–3 || Key (1–1) || Belcher || Howe (1) || 17,519 || 4–3
|- bgcolor="ccffcc"
| 8 || April 12 || Rangers || 4–3 || Cone (2–0) || Hill || Wetteland (1) || 20,238 || 5–3
|- bgcolor="ffbbbb"
| 9 || April 13 || Rangers || 6–10 || Pavlik || Gooden (0–2) || Vosberg || 19,603 || 5–4
|- bgcolor="ccffcc"
| 10 || April 14 || Rangers || 12–3 || Pettitte (3–0) || Gross || — || 20,181 || 6–4
|- bgcolor="ffbbbb"
| 11 || April 16 || @ Brewers || 3–6 || Karl || Key (1–2) || — || 7,059 || 6–5
|- bgcolor="ffbbbb"
| 12 || April 17 || @ Brewers || 4–8 || Bones || Cone (2–1) || — || 7,124 || 6–6
|- bgcolor="ffbbbb"
| 13 || April 19 || @ Twins || 1–7 || Rodriguez || Gooden (0–3) || — || 20,279 || 6–7
|- bgcolor="ccffcc"
| 14 || April 20 || @ Twins || 7–6 || Wickman (1–0) || Guardado || Wetteland (2) || 24,586 || 7–7
|- bgcolor="ccffcc"
| 15 || April 21 || @ Twins || 9–5 || Rogers (1–0) || Radke || — || 20,115 || 8–7
|- bgcolor="ccffcc"
| 16 || April 22 || @ Royals || 6–2 || Cone (3–1) || Appier || — || 14,763 || 9–7
|- bgcolor="ffbbbb"
| 17 || April 23 || @ Royals || 2–5 || Gubicza || Key (1–3) || Montgomery || 12,536 || 9–8
|- bgcolor="ccffcc"
| 18 || April 24 || Indians || 10–8 || Kamieniecki (1–0) || Martinez || — || 20,187 || 10–8
|- bgcolor="ffbbbb"
| 19 || April 25 || Indians || 3–4 || Poole || Pettitte (3–1) || Mesa || 18,580 || 10–9
|- bgcolor="ccffcc"
| 20 || April 26 || Twins || 5–4 || Rivera (1–0) || Radke || Wetteland (3) || 14,450 || 11–9
|- bgcolor="ffbbbb"
| 21 || April 27 || Twins || 6–8 (10) || Bennett || Wickman (1–1) || — || 20,025 || 11–10
|- bgcolor="ccffcc"
| 22 || April 28 || Twins || 6–3 || Rivera (2–0) || Rodriguez || Wetteland (4) || 24,793 || 12–10
|- bgcolor="ccffcc"
| 23 || April 30 || @ Orioles || 13–10 || Nelson (1–0) || Shepherd || Wetteland (5) || 43,117 || 13–10
|-

|- bgcolor="ccffcc"
| 24 || May 1 || @ Orioles || 11–6 (15) || Pettitte (4–1) || Mercker || — || 47,472 || 14–10
|- bgcolor="ccffcc"
| 25 || May 2 || White Sox || 5–1 || Cone (4–1) || Fernandez || — || 19,773 || 15–10
|- bgcolor="ccffcc"
| 26 || May 3 || White Sox || 2–0 || Rivera (3–0) || Thomas || Wetteland (6) || 15,599 || 16–10
|- bgcolor="ffbbbb"
| 27 || May 4 || White Sox || 5–11 || Karchner || Nelson (1–1) || — || 20,661 || 16–11
|- bgcolor="ccffcc"
| 28 || May 5 || White Sox || 7–1 || Pettitte (5–1) || Tapani || — || 26,525 || 17–11
|- bgcolor="ccffcc"
| 29 || May 6 || Tigers || 10–5 || Wickman (2–1) || Myers || — || 12,838 || 18–11
|- bgcolor="ccffcc"
| 30 || May 7 || Tigers || 12–5 || Mecir (1–0) || Lewis || Nelson (2) || 12,760 || 19–11
|- bgcolor="ccffcc"
| 31 || May 8 || Tigers || 10–3 || Gooden (1–3) || Keagle || — || 18,729 || 20–11
|- bgcolor="ffbbbb"
| 32 || May 9 || Tigers || 2–4 || Gohr || Key (1–4) || Myers || 13,098 || 20–12
|- bgcolor="ffbbbb"
| 33 || May 10 || @ White Sox || 2–5 || Tapani || Pettitte (5–2) || Hernandez || 15,784 || 20–13
|- bgcolor="ffbbbb"
| 34 || May 11 || @ White Sox || 5–7 || McCaskill || Wetteland (0–1) || — || 25,722 || 20–14
|- bgcolor="ccffcc"
| 35 || May 12 || @ White Sox || 9–8 || Wickman (3–1) || Thomas || Wetteland (7) || 17,405 || 21–14
|- bgcolor="ccffcc"
| 36 || May 14 || Mariners || 2–0 || Gooden (2–3) || Hitchcock || — || 20,786 || 22–14
|- bgcolor="ffbbbb"
| 37 || May 15 || Mariners || 5–10 || Hurtado || Key (1–5) || — || 20,680 || 22–15
|- bgcolor="ccffcc"
| 38 || May 17 || Angels || 8–5 || Pettitte (6–2) || Abbott || Rivera (1) || 19,087 || 23–15
|- bgcolor="ccffcc"
| 39 || May 18 || Angels || 7–3 || Rogers (2–0) || Williams || Rivera (2) || 22,821 || 24–15
|- bgcolor="ffbbbb"
| 40 || May 19 || Angels || 1–10 || Finley || Kamieniecki (1–1) || — || 37,326 || 24–16
|- bgcolor="ccffcc"
| 41 || May 21 || Athletics || 7–3 || Gooden (3–3) || Reyes || — || 15,614 || 25–16
|- bgcolor="ffbbbb"
| 42 || May 22 || Athletics || 1–5 || Wojciechowski || Pettitte (6–3) || Mohler || 18,544 || 25–17
|- bgcolor="ccffcc"
| 43 || May 23 || Athletics || 4–3 || Rogers (3–0) || Taylor || Wetteland (8) || 19,315 || 26–17
|- bgcolor="ffbbbb"
| 44 || May 24 || @ Mariners || 4–10 || Hitchcock || Kamieniecki (1–2) || — || 44,236 || 26–18
|- bgcolor="ccffcc"
| 45 || May 25 || @ Mariners || 5–4 || Mendoza (1–0) || Hurtado || Wetteland (9) || 57,173 || 27–18
|- bgcolor="ffbbbb"
| 46 || May 26 || @ Mariners || 3–4 || Menhart || Gooden (3–4) || Charlton || 42,410 || 27–19
|- bgcolor="ccffcc"
| 47 || May 27 || @ Angels || 16–5 || Pettitte (7–3) || Abbott || — || 20,926 || 28–19
|- bgcolor="ffbbbb"
| 48 || May 28 || @ Angels || 0–1 || Grimsley || Rogers (3–1) || — || 17,284 || 28–20
|- bgcolor="ffbbbb"
| 49 || May 29 || @ Angels || 0–4 || Finley || Mendoza (1–1) || — || 19,246 || 28–21
|- bgcolor="ccffcc"
| 50 || May 31 || @ Athletics || 4–1 || Key (2–5) || Johns || Wetteland (10) || 13,279 || 29–21
|-

|- bgcolor="ccffcc"
| 51 || June 1 || @ Athletics || 6–3 || Pettitte (8–3) || Chouinard || Wetteland (11) || 21,354 || 30–21
|- bgcolor="ccffcc"
| 52 || June 2 || @ Athletics || 11–4 || Rogers (4–1) || Wojciechowski || Wetteland (12) || 26,331 || 31–21
|- bgcolor="ccffcc"
| 53 || June 4 || Blue Jays || 5–4 || Gooden (4–4) || Hanson || Wetteland (13) || 17,368 || 32–21
|- bgcolor="ffbbbb"
| 54 || June 5 || Blue Jays || 7–12 || Hentgen || Key (2–6) || — || 17,142 || 32–22
|- bgcolor="ccffcc"
| 55 || June 6 || Blue Jays || 8–1 || Pettitte (9–3) || Quantrill || — || 18,475 || 33–22
|- bgcolor="ffbbbb"
| 56 || June 7 || @ Tigers || 5–6 || Lewis || Nelson (1–2) || — || 16,350 || 33–23
|- bgcolor="ffbbbb"
| 57 || June 8 || @ Tigers || 7–9 || Olson || Rogers (4–2) || Lewis || 20,173 || 33–24
|- bgcolor="ccffcc"
| 58 || June 9 || @ Tigers || 3–2 || Gooden (5–4) || Gohr || Wetteland (14) || 16,588 || 34–24
|- bgcolor="ccffcc"
| 59 || June 10 || @ Blue Jays || 5–3 || Key (3–6) || Hentgen || Wetteland (15) || 37,332 || 35–24
|- bgcolor="ccffcc"
| 60 || June 11 || @ Blue Jays || 6–4 || Pettitte (10–3) || Quantrill || Wetteland (16) || 32,114 || 36–24
|- bgcolor="ffbbbb"
| 61 || June 12 || @ Blue Jays || 4–7 || Janzen || Mendoza (1–2) || — || 44,238 || 36–25
|- bgcolor="ffbbbb"
| 62 || June 13 || Indians || 2–6 || Hershiser || Rogers (4–3) || Shuey || 30,707 || 36–26
|- bgcolor="ccffcc"
| 63 || June 14 || Indians || 4–3 || Gooden (6–4) || Ogea || Wetteland (17) || 32,580 || 37–26
|- bgcolor="ffbbbb"
| 64 || June 15 || Indians || 3–10 || Nagy || Boehringer (0–1) || — || 42,032 || 37–27
|- bgcolor="ccffcc"
| 65 || June 16 || Indians || 5–4 || Pettitte (11–3) || Martinez || Wetteland (18) || 51,180 || 38–27
|- bgcolor="ffbbbb"
| 66 || June 17 || Twins || 3–6 || Aldred || Mendoza (1–3) || Naulty || 16,189 || 38–28
|- bgcolor="ccffcc"
| 67 || June 18 || Twins || 2–0 || Rogers (5–3) || Radke || Wetteland (19) || 17,593 || 39–28
|- bgcolor="ccffcc"
| 68 || June 21 || @ Indians || 8–7 (10) || Nelson (2–2) || Mesa || Wetteland (20) || 42,176 || 40–28
|- bgcolor="ccffcc"
| 69 || June 21 || @ Indians || 9–3 || Mendoza (2–3) || Tavarez || — || 42,454 || 41–28
|- bgcolor="ccffcc"
| 70 || June 22 || @ Indians || 11–9 || Brewer (1–0) || Martinez || Wetteland (21) || 42,461 || 42–28
|- bgcolor="ccffcc"
| 71 || June 23 || @ Indians || 6–5 || Gooden (7–4) || McDowell || Wetteland (22) || 41,767 || 43–28
|- bgcolor="ffbbbb"
| 72 || June 24 || @ Twins || 0–3 || Robertson || Pettitte (11–4) || — || 20,488 || 43–29
|- bgcolor="ffbbbb"
| 73 || June 25 || @ Twins || 1–6 || Rodriguez || Boehringer (0–2) || — || — || 43–30
|- bgcolor="ccffcc"
| 74 || June 25 || @ Twins || 6–2 || Mendoza (3–3) || Serafini || — || 16,641 || 44–30
|- bgcolor="ccffcc"
| 75 || June 26 || @ Twins || 2–1 || Polley (1–0) || Guardado || Wetteland (23) || 19,116 || 45–30
|- bgcolor="ccffcc"
| 76 || June 27 || Orioles || 3–2 || Rogers (6–3) || Erickson || Wetteland (24) || 34,161 || 46–30
|- bgcolor="ffbbbb"
| 77 || June 28 || Orioles || 4–7 || Rhodes || Rivera (3–1) || Myers || 43,515 || 46–31
|- bgcolor="ccffcc"
| 78 || June 29 || Orioles || 4–3 || Pettitte (12–4) || Mussina || Wetteland (25) || 45,295 || 47–31
|- bgcolor="ffbbbb"
| 79 || June 30 || Orioles || 1–9 || Wells || Mendoza (3–4) || — || 40,200 || 47–32
|-

|- bgcolor="ccffcc"
| 80 || July 1 || Red Sox || 2–0 || Key (4–6) || Clemens || Wetteland (26) || 27,734 || 48–32
|- bgcolor="ccffcc"
| 81 || July 2 || Red Sox || 7–5 || Nelson (3–2) || Hudson || Wetteland (27) || 28,310 || 49–32
|- bgcolor="ccffcc"
| 82 || July 4 || Brewers || 4–1 || Pettitte (13–4) || Karl || Wetteland (28) || 24,243 || 50–32
|- bgcolor="ccffcc"
| 83 || July 5 || Brewers || 12–3 || Gooden (8–4) || Bones || — || 26,699 || 51–32
|- bgcolor="ccffcc"
| 84 || July 6 || Brewers || 2–0 || Key (5–6) || Sparks || Wetteland (29) || 24,033 || 52–32
|- bgcolor="ffbbbb"
| 85 || July 7 || Brewers || 1–4 || McDonald || Rogers (6–4) || Fetters || 35,242 || 52–33
|- bgcolor="ccffcc"
| 86 || July 11 || @ Orioles || 4–2 || Key (6–6) || Mussina || Wetteland (30) || 46,760 || 53–33
|- bgcolor="ccffcc"
| 87 || July 13 || @ Orioles || 3–2 || Nelson (4–2) || Wells || Wetteland (31) || — || 54–33
|- bgcolor="ccffcc"
| 88 || July 13 || @ Orioles || 7–5 || Gooden (9–4) || Rhodes || Wetteland (32) || 46,451 || 55–33
|- bgcolor="ccffcc"
| 89 || July 14 || @ Orioles || 4–1 || Pettitte (14–4) || Erickson || Wetteland (33) || 47,658 || 56–33
|- bgcolor="ffbbbb"
| 90 || July 15 || @ Red Sox || 6–8 || Wakefield || Hutton (0–1) || Slocumb || 33,263 || 56–34
|- bgcolor="ccffcc"
| 91 || July 16 || @ Red Sox || 9–5 || Key (7–6) || Clemens || — || 34,676 || 57–34
|- bgcolor="ffbbbb"
| 92 || July 17 || @ Red Sox || 11–12 || Eshelman || Wetteland (0–2) || — || 34,082 || 57–35
|- bgcolor="ffbbbb"
| 93 || July 18 || @ Brewers || 4–16 || Karl || Gooden (9–5) || — || 19,079 || 57–36
|- bgcolor="ffbbbb"
| 94 || July 19 || @ Brewers || 5–7 || Eldred || Pettitte (14–5) || Fetters || 19,300 || 57–37
|- bgcolor="ccffcc"
| 95 || July 20 || @ Brewers || 4–2 || Rivera (4–1) || Van Egmond || Wetteland (34) || 25,473 || 58–37
|- bgcolor="ffbbbb"
| 96 || July 21 || @ Brewers || 2–3 || D'Amico || Key (7–7) || Fetters || 25,662 || 58–38
|- bgcolor="ffbbbb"
| 97 || July 22 || Rangers || 1–6 || Hill || Rogers (6–5) || — || 30,767 || 58–39
|- bgcolor="ccffcc"
| 98 || July 23 || Rangers || 6–0 || Gooden (10–5) || Pavlik || — || 22,814 || 59–39
|- bgcolor="ccffcc"
| 99 || July 24 || Rangers || 4–2 || Pettitte (15–5) || Alberro || Wetteland (35) || 35,308 || 60–39
|- bgcolor="ffbbbb"
| 100 || July 25 || Royals || 0–7 || Rosado || Hutton (0–2) || — || 23,475 || 60–40
|- bgcolor="ccffcc"
| 101 || July 26 || Royals || 15–1 || Key (8–7) || Haney || — || 23,782 || 61–40
|- bgcolor="ccffcc"
| 102 || July 27 || Royals || 5–4 || Rogers (7–5) || Belcher || Wetteland (36) || 42,044 || 62–40
|- bgcolor="ccffcc"
| 103 || July 28 || Royals || 3–2 || Wetteland (1–2) || Jacome || — || 35,658 || 63–40
|- bgcolor="ffbbbb"
| 104 || July 30 || @ Rangers || 2–15 || Witt || Pettitte (15–6) || — || 39,637 || 63–41
|- bgcolor="ffbbbb"
| 105 || July 31 || @ Rangers || 2–9 || Oliver || Key (8–8) || — || 30,645 || 63–42
|-

|- bgcolor="ccffcc"
| 106 || August 1 || @ Rangers || 6–5 || Rogers (8–5) || Hill || Wetteland (37) || 34,855 || 64–42
|- bgcolor="ffbbbb"
| 107 || August 2 || @ Royals || 3–4 (10) || Montgomery || Rivera (4–2) || — || 28,618 || 64–43
|- bgcolor="ffbbbb"
| 108 || August 3 || @ Royals || 4–11 || Linton || Weathers (0–1) || — || 29,355 || 64–44
|- bgcolor="ccffcc"
| 109 || August 4 || @ Royals || 5–3 || Pettitte (16–6) || Rosado || — || 24,624 || 65–44
|- bgcolor="ccffcc"
| 110 || August 5 || @ Royals || 5–2 || Key (9–8) || Pichardo || Wetteland (38) || 22,865 || 66–44
|- bgcolor="ccffcc"
| 111 || August 6 || White Sox || 9–2 || Rogers (9–5) || Tapani || — || 33,025 || 67–44
|- bgcolor="ffbbbb"
| 112 || August 7 || White Sox || 4–8 (10) || Hernandez || Nelson (4–3) || — || 31,098 || 67–45
|- bgcolor="ccffcc"
| 113 || August 8 || White Sox || 8–4 || Wickman (4–1) || Andujar || Rivera (3) || 35,898 || 68–45
|- bgcolor="ffbbbb"
| 114 || August 9 || Tigers || 3–5 || Cummings || Pettitte (16–7) || Myers || 23,439 || 68–46
|- bgcolor="ffbbbb"
| 115 || August 10 || Tigers || 7–13 || Lewis || Key (9–9) || — || 28,863 || 68–47
|- bgcolor="ccffcc"
| 116 || August 11 || Tigers || 12–0 || Rogers (10–5) || Lira || — || 33,517 || 69–47
|- bgcolor="ffbbbb"
| 117 || August 12 || @ White Sox || 2–3 (10) || Hernandez || Wetteland (1–3) || — || 32,492 || 69–48
|- bgcolor="ffbbbb"
| 118 || August 13 || @ White Sox || 4–8 || Bertotti || Weathers (0–2) || — || 26,455 || 69–49
|- bgcolor="ccffcc"
| 119 || August 14 || @ White Sox || 3–1 || Pettitte (17–7) || Baldwin || Rivera (4) || 23,350 || 70–49
|- bgcolor="ffbbbb"
| 120 || August 16 || Mariners || 5–6 || Hitchcock || Polley (1–1) || Jackson || 50,724 || 70–50
|- bgcolor="ffbbbb"
| 121 || August 17 || Mariners || 3–10 || Moyer || Rogers (10–6) || — || 51,729 || 70–51
|- bgcolor="ffbbbb"
| 122 || August 18 || Mariners || 12–13 (12) || Ayala || Mecir (1–1) || Jackson || 44,769 || 70–52
|- bgcolor="ccffcc"
| 123 || August 19 || Mariners || 10–4 || Pettitte (18–7) || Carmona || — || 33,994 || 71–52
|- bgcolor="ccffcc"
| 124 || August 20 || Angels || 17–6 || Boehringer (1–2) || Springer || — || 20,795 || 72–52
|- bgcolor="ffbbbb"
| 125 || August 21 || Angels || 1–7 || Dickson || Key (9–10) || Percival || 27,811 || 72–53
|- bgcolor="ffbbbb"
| 126 || August 22 || Angels || 3–12 || Finley || Rogers (10–7) || — || 27,191 || 72–54
|- bgcolor="ccffcc"
| 127 || August 23 || Athletics || 5–3 || Gooden (11–5) || Wengert || Rivera (5) || 34,244 || 73–54
|- bgcolor="ccffcc"
| 128 || August 24 || Athletics || 5–4 || Whitehurst (1–0) || Telgheder || Pavlas (1) || 32,125 || 74–54
|- bgcolor="ffbbbb"
| 129 || August 25 || Athletics || 4–6 || Mohler || Nelson (4–4) || Acre || 50,808 || 74–55
|- bgcolor="ffbbbb"
| 130 || August 26 || @ Mariners || 1–2 || Ayala || Lloyd (0–1) || Charlton || 32,857 || 74–56
|- bgcolor="ffbbbb"
| 131 || August 27 || @ Mariners || 4–7 || Moyer || Lloyd (0–2) || — || 32,975 || 74–57
|- bgcolor="ffbbbb"
| 132 || August 28 || @ Mariners || 2–10 || Mulholland || Gooden (11–6) || — || 30,952 || 74–58
|- bgcolor="ffbbbb"
| 133 || August 29 || @ Angels || 3–14 || Holtz || Whitehurst (1–1) || — || 19,755 || 74–59
|- bgcolor="ccffcc"
| 134 || August 30 || @ Angels || 6–2 || Pettitte (19–7) || Springer || — || 27,084 || 75–59
|- bgcolor="ccffcc"
| 135 || August 31 || @ Angels || 14–3 || Key (10–10) || Dickson || — || 28,749 || 76–59
|-

|- bgcolor="ffbbbb"
| 136 || September 1 || @ Angels || 0–4 || Finley || Rogers (10–8) || — || 19,384 || 76–60
|- bgcolor="ccffcc"
| 137 || September 2 || @ Athletics || 5–0 || Cone (5–1) || Prieto || — || 20,159 || 77–60
|- bgcolor="ffbbbb"
| 138 || September 3 || @ Athletics || 9–10 || Acre || Boehringer (1–3) || Johns || 11,621 || 77–61
|- bgcolor="ccffcc"
| 139 || September 4 || @ Athletics || 10–3 || Pettitte (20–7) || Telgheder || — || 9,892 || 78–61
|- bgcolor="ccffcc"
| 140 || September 6 || Blue Jays || 4–3 || Rivera (5–2) || Risley || — || 21,528 || 79–61
|- bgcolor="ffbbbb"
| 141 || September 7 || Blue Jays || 2–3 || Quantrill || Cone (5–2) || Timlin || 27,069 || 79–62
|- bgcolor="ffbbbb"
| 142 || September 8 || Blue Jays || 2–4 || Hanson || Pettitte (20–8) || Timlin || 28,575 || 79–63
|- bgcolor="ccffcc"
| 143 || September 10 || @ Tigers || 9–8 || Rivera (6–2) || Sager || Wetteland (39) || 11,042 || 80–63
|- bgcolor="ccffcc"
| 144 || September 11 || @ Tigers || 7–3 || Key (11–10) || Lira || — || 9,775 || 81–63
|- bgcolor="ccffcc"
| 145 || September 12 || @ Tigers || 12–3 || Cone (6–2) || Thompson || — || 9,009 || 82–63
|- bgcolor="ccffcc"
| 146 || September 13 || @ Blue Jays || 4–1 || Pettitte (21–8) || Hanson || Wetteland (40) || 31,227 || 83–63
|- bgcolor="ccffcc"
| 147 || September 14 || @ Blue Jays || 3–1 || Boehringer (2–3) || Hentgen || Wetteland (41) || 43,397 || 84–63
|- bgcolor="ffbbbb"
| 148 || September 15 || @ Blue Jays || 1–3 || Williams || Mendoza (3–5) || Timlin || 36,268 || 84–64
|- bgcolor="ccffcc"
| 149 || September 16 || @ Blue Jays || 10–0 || Key (12–10) || Quantrill || — || 30,115 || 85–64
|- bgcolor="ccffcc"
| 150 || September 18 || Orioles || 3–2 (10) || Rivera (7–2) || Mills || — || 40,775 || 86–64
|- bgcolor="ccffcc"
| 151 || September 19 || Orioles || 9–3 || Rogers (11–8) || Mussina || — || — || 87–64
|- bgcolor="ffbbbb"
| 152 || September 19 || Orioles || 9–10 || Mathews || Rivera (7–3) || Myers || 54,888 || 87–65
|- bgcolor="ffbbbb"
| 153 || September 20 || Red Sox || 2–4 || Wakefield || Polley (1–2) || Slocumb || 39,883 || 87–66
|- bgcolor="ccffcc"
| 154 || September 21 || Red Sox || 12–11 (10) || Wetteland (2–3) || Hudson || — || 54,599 || 88–66
|- bgcolor="ccffcc"
| 155 || September 22 || Red Sox || 4–3 || Rivera (8–3) || Sele || Wetteland (42) || 34,422 || 89–66
|- bgcolor="ffbbbb"
| 156 || September 23 || Red Sox || 3–4 (11) || Slocumb || Boehringer (2–4) || Mahomes || 22,728 || 89–67
|- bgcolor="ccffcc"
| 157 || September 25 || Brewers || 19–2 || Cone (7–2) || Van Egmond || — || — || 90–67
|- bgcolor="ccffcc"
| 158 || September 25 || Brewers || 6–2 || Rogers (12–8) || Karl || — || 37,947 || 91–67
|- bgcolor="ffbbbb"
| 159 || September 26 || @ Red Sox || 3–5 || Maddux || Key (12–11) || Slocumb || 32,367 || 91–68
|- bgcolor="ffbbbb"
| 160 || September 27 || @ Red Sox || 5–7 || Sele || Gooden (11–7) || Slocumb || 32,573 || 91–69
|- bgcolor="ccffcc"
| 161 || September 28 || @ Red Sox || 4–2 || Mendoza (4–5) || Clemens || Wetteland (43) || 33,612 || 92–69
|- bgcolor="ffbbbb"
| 162 || September 29 || @ Red Sox || 5–6 || Mahomes || Polley (1–3) || — || 32,563 || 92–70
|-

|-
| Legend:       = Win       = LossBold = Yankees team member

Detailed records

Roster

Player stats

Batting

Starters by position
Note: Pos = Position; G = Games played; AB = At bats; H = Hits; Avg. = Batting average; HR = Home runs; RBI = Runs batted in

Other batters
Note: G = Games played; AB = At bats; H = Hits; Avg. = Batting average; HR = Home runs; RBI = Runs batted in

Pitching

Starting pitchers
Note: G = Games pitched; IP = Innings pitched; W = Wins; L = Losses; ERA = Earned run average; SO = Strikeouts

Other pitchers
Note: G = Games pitched; IP = Innings pitched; W = Wins; L = Losses; ERA = Earned run average; SO = Strikeouts

Relief pitchers
Note: G = Games pitched; W = Wins; L = Losses; SV = Saves; ERA = Earned run average; SO = Strikeouts

ALDS

Game 1, October 1
Yankee Stadium, The Bronx, New York

Game 2, October 2
Yankee Stadium, The Bronx, New York

Game 3, October 4
The Ballpark in Arlington, Arlington, Texas

Game 4, October 5
The Ballpark in Arlington, Arlington, Texas

Postseason

ALCS

Jeffrey Maier 
On October 9, 1996, the Yankees trailed the Orioles 4–3 in the bottom of the eighth inning when shortstop Derek Jeter hit a deep fly ball to right field.  Right fielder Tony Tarasco moved near the fence and appeared "to draw a bead on the ball" when then-12 year old fan Jeffrey Maier reached over the fence separating the stands and the field of play 9 feet below and deflected the ball into the stands.  While baseball fans are permitted to catch (and keep) balls hit into the stands, if "a spectator reaches out of the stands, or goes on the playing field, and touches a live ball"  spectator interference is to be called.

1996 World Series

Game 1
October 20, 1996, at Yankee Stadium in The Bronx, New York

Game 2
October 21, 1996, at Yankee Stadium in The Bronx, New York

Game 3
October 22, 1996, at Atlanta–Fulton County Stadium in Atlanta

Game 4
October 23, 1996, at Atlanta–Fulton County Stadium in Atlanta

Game 5
October 24, 1996, at Atlanta–Fulton County Stadium in Atlanta

Game 6
October 26, 1996, at Yankee Stadium in The Bronx, New York

Awards and honors
 1996 New York Yankees – 1997 Outstanding Team ESPY Award
 Cecil Fielder, Babe Ruth Award
 Derek Jeter, SS, American League Rookie of the Year
 Bernie Williams, ALCS Most Valuable Player
 John Wetteland, World Series Most Valuable Player

All-Stars 
All-Star Game
 Wade Boggs, third base, starter
 Andy Pettitte, pitcher, reserve
 John Wetteland, relief pitcher, reserve

Farm system

References

External links
1996 New York Yankees at Baseball Reference
1996 World Series
1996 New York Yankees at Baseball Almanac

New York Yankees seasons
New York Yankees
New York Yankees
1990s in the Bronx
American League East champion seasons
American League champion seasons
World Series champion seasons